Seelbach may refer to the following places in Germany:

Seelbach, Baden-Württemberg
Seelbach, Rhein-Lahn, in the Rhein-Lahn-Kreis, Rhineland-Palatinate
Seelbach, Altenkirchen, in the district of Altenkirchen, Rhineland-Palatinate
Seelbach bei Hamm, in the district of Altenkirchen, Rhineland-Palatinate

Seelbach may also refer to:

The Seelbach Hotel in Louisville, Kentucky
A Seelbach, a bourbon and orange liquor based cocktail.